Pyrausta centralis is a moth in the family Crambidae. It was described by Koen V. N. Maes in 2009. It is found in Ethiopia, Kenya and Tanzania.

References

Moths described in 2009
centralis
Moths of Africa